The 2010–11 Alaska Aces season was the 25th season of the franchise in the Philippine Basketball Association (PBA).

Key dates
August 29: The 2010 PBA Draft took place in Fort Bonifacio, Taguig.

Draft picks

Roster

Philippine Cup

Eliminations

Standings

Commissioner's Cup

Eliminations

Standings

Governors Cup

Eliminations

Standings

Semifinals

Standings

Transactions

Pre-season

Commissioner's Cup

Governors Cup

Recruited imports

References

Alaska Aces (PBA) seasons
Alaska